Roosa Kanerva (born 17 March 1999) is a Finnish diver. In 2019, she finished in 34th place in the preliminary round in the women's 1 metre springboard event at the 2019 World Aquatics Championships held in Gwangju, South Korea.

In 2015, she competed in the women's 1 metre springboard event at the 2015 European Games held in Baku, Azerbaijan.

In 2019, she also finished in 23rd place in the preliminary round in the women's 1 metre springboard at the 2019 European Diving Championships held in Kyiv, Ukraine.

References 

Living people
1999 births
Place of birth missing (living people)
Finnish female divers
European Games competitors for Finland
Divers at the 2015 European Games